Eric Robert Fernsten (born November 1, 1953) is an American retired professional basketball player. A 6'10" center from the University of San Francisco, Fernsten played in the National Basketball Association as a member of the Cleveland Cavaliers, Chicago Bulls, Boston Celtics, and New York Knicks.

Professional career

Fernsten played in the National Basketball Association as a member of the Cleveland Cavaliers, Chicago Bulls, Boston Celtics, and New York Knicks. He averaged 2.4 points per game and 1.7 rebounds per game in his NBA career and participated on Boston's 1981 NBA Championship team. In the NBA finals, he scored 2 points and grabbed 2 rebounds in Boston's game 5 blowout win against Houston. Eric also played basketball in Europe for several years. Fernsten was key practice player whom pushed the veterans to work harder.

References

External links
Career statistics

1953 births
Living people
Albany Patroons players
American expatriate basketball people in Italy
American men's basketball players
Basketball players from Oakland, California
Boston Celtics players
Centers (basketball)
Chicago Bulls players
Cleveland Cavaliers draft picks
Cleveland Cavaliers players
Mens Sana Basket players
New York Knicks players
Power forwards (basketball)
San Francisco Dons men's basketball players
Tampa Bay Thrillers players